The women's 4 × 100 metres relay races at the 2000 Summer Olympics as part of the athletics program were held on Friday, 29 September and Saturday, 30 September.

Records
These were the standing world and Olympic records (in minutes:seconds) prior to the 2000 Summer Olympics.

Medals
On 23 November 2007, the IAAF recommended to the IOC Executive Board to disqualify the USA women's 4 × 100 m and 4 × 400 m relay teams after Marion Jones admitted to having taken performance-enhancing drugs prior to the Games. On 12 December, the IOC disqualified Jones and stripped her of her relay medals but it did not disqualify the U.S. relay teams. On 10 April 2008, the IOC disqualified both U.S. relay teams and asked for Jones' teammates' medals to be returned. France (Linda Ferga, Muriel Hurtis, Fabe Dia, Christine Arron, Sandra Citte*) finished fourth in the  relay in a time of 42.42, and Nigeria (Olabisi Afolabi, Opara Charity, Rosemary Okafor, Falilat Ogunkoya-Osheku, Doris Jacob*) finished fourth in the  relay in a time of 3:23.80.
All members of the U.S. relay teams except Nanceen Perry then appealed to the Court of Arbitration for Sport who on 16 July 2010 ruled in favor of them due to the fact that, according to the rules at the time, a team should not be disqualified because of a doping offense of one athlete. Their medals were then restored to them.

* Athletes who participated in the heats only, and also received medals.

Golden Girls
Bahamas was so enamored by their winning team, they celebrated their "Golden Girls" with a very visible mural at the Nassau airport.

Results

Abbreviations 
All times shown are in seconds.
Q denotes automatic qualification.
q denotes fastest losers.
DNS denotes did not start.
DNF denotes did not finish.
AR denotes area record.
NR denotes national record.
SB denotes season's best.

Heats

Heat 1 
First 3 in each heat (Q) and four fastest losers (q) advance to the semi-finals.

Heat 2

Heat 3

Heat 4

Round 1- Overall

Semi-finals 
First three in each heat (Q) and two fastest losers (q) advance to the final.

Heat 1

Heat 2

Semi-Finals- Overall

Final 
30 September 2000

References

External links 
Source: Official Report of the 2000 Sydney Summer Olympics available at  https://web.archive.org/web/20080522105330/http://www.la84foundation.org/5va/reports_frmst.htm
Results, round 1 - IAAF
Results, semi-finals - IAAF
Results, final - IAAF

4 x 100 metres relay women
Relay foot races at the Olympics
2000 in women's athletics
Women's events at the 2000 Summer Olympics